Xingnan Subdistrict is a subdistrict situated on the northeast of Nankai District, Tianjin, China. It borders Gulou Subdistrict to its north, Nanshi and Quanyechang Subdistricts to its east. Wanxing Subdistrict to its south, Guangkai Subdistrict to its west. In the year 2010, the subdistrict had 43,744 inhabitants under its administration.

The subdistrict was created from Paotaizhuang and Nanmenxi Subdistricts in 1999. Its name Xingnan was given with the intended meaning of "Make Nankai District Prosperous".

Administrative divisions 
As of the year 2021, Xingnan Subdistrict consisted of the following 9 residential communities:

Gallery

References 

Township-level divisions of Tianjin
Nankai District, Tianjin